Yudhvir Singh (born 13 September 1997) is an Indian cricketer. He made his Twenty20 debut on 12 November 2019, for Hyderabad in the 2019–20 Syed Mushtaq Ali Trophy. He made his first-class debut on 17 December 2019, for Hyderabad in the 2019–20 Ranji Trophy. In February 2021, Singh was bought by the Mumbai Indians in the IPL auction ahead of the 2021 Indian Premier League.

References

External links
 

1997 births
Living people
Indian cricketers
Hyderabad cricketers
Place of birth missing (living people)